Emiliano Albín Antognazza (born 24 January 1989) is a Uruguayan professional footballer who plays for Villa Española.

He played for the Uruguay Olympic football team, and competed at both the 2011 Guadalajara Pan American Games and the 2012 London Olympics.

Club career
Emiliano debuted in 2009 for Peñarol against Montevideo Wanderers.

In 2012, he was loaned to Boca Juniors. He made his debut in Boca against Independiente on 22 August for the Copa Sudamericana, and then he played next Saturday against Unión for the local league.

References

External links
 

1989 births
Living people
People from Canelones Department
Uruguayan footballers
Uruguayan expatriate footballers
Peñarol players
Boca Juniors footballers
F.C. Arouca players
San Martín de Tucumán footballers
Deportivo Santaní players
C.S.D. Villa Española players
Uruguayan Primera División players
Argentine Primera División players
Primeira Liga players
Primera Nacional players
Paraguayan Primera División players
Olympic footballers of Uruguay
Footballers at the 2012 Summer Olympics
Pan American Games medalists in football
Pan American Games bronze medalists for Uruguay
Association football fullbacks
Footballers at the 2011 Pan American Games
Medalists at the 2011 Pan American Games
Uruguayan expatriate sportspeople in Argentina
Uruguayan expatriate sportspeople in Portugal
Uruguayan expatriate sportspeople in Paraguay
Expatriate footballers in Argentina
Expatriate footballers in Portugal
Expatriate footballers in Paraguay